Antipater was in ancient Greece a writer on the interpretation of dreams (Oneirocritica), mentioned by fellow writer on dreams Artemidorus in his Oneirocritica. His works are now lost, and the only reference to his work is in Artemidorus, who mentions Antipater's thoughts on a dream where the dreamer had sexual intercourse with a piece of iron.

Notes

Ancient Greek writers